The Boat is a 2018 Maltese thriller drama film directed by Winston Azzopardi and written by Joe Azzopardi and Winston Azzopardi. Joe Azzopardi is the only cast member, and the film has very few spoken lines.

Plot 
The film stars Joe Azzopardi as a lone sailor who finds an abandoned sailboat. Out of curiosity, he approaches the abandoned sailboat, ties his boat to the Sailboat and jumps aboard and checks out the Sail to learn that there is no one present. He comes outside to realise that his boat tied to the abandoned Sailboat is gone and nowhere in sight. He goes to the deck and when he is about to urinate, one of the sails hit him and he almost goes overboard before he catches the railing in time and jumps back to the Sailboat.

He then proceeds to the bathroom and urinates and the door automatically closes. To his horror he realises that the door does not open. He finds a small window and opens it to find a Cargo ship passing by. He panics and tries to open the door, but in vain. He spends the night which is hit by a storm and he passes out on the bathroom floor. The next morning he finds water has flooded the sail boat and the water level is raising by each passing minute. He finds a rope hanging outside the bathroom window and throws it in the water which eventually tangles with the turbine and slows down the sailboat. With water level raising, he submerges and looks at the door knob and pushes it hard to break the door.

He quickly escapes and goes to the deck to find a floating device which he ties to the broken door hoping to sail away in his makeshift boat. However, he notices that the Sailboat follows him and almost hits him before he jumps into the water. Now that the Sailboat is gone as well as his makeshift boat, he floats in the sea to find some dolphins swimming near him. To his horror he turns around to find that the Sailboat has come back. He goes into the Sailboat and goes to another bathroom where he finds a small door which leads him into a secret cabin filled with food supplies. He finds a small window and tries opening it, but the window doesn't budge. The small door which he entered suddenly shuts and he is trapped again. He peeps outside the window to see ancient ruins with no visible human around. 

In the meanwhile, the small door through which he had entered now automatically opens and he goes outside and disembarks the sailboat and wanders around the ruins. He notices that the Sailboat follows him as he walks exploring the land. He walks around until he discovers his boat tied on the shore which he had lost earlier. The Sailboat sails away and the camera follows an abandoned Island where many other small boats are present and there a few people. 

The camera further follows into a cave and through a small opening in the cave, it is seen that the Sailboat is heading out in the sea for its next victim.

Production 
The film was shot at the Malta Film Studios water tanks and around the coast of Malta.  The film was shot over 22 days, 2 identical Beneteau First 45F5 sailboats were used.  Filming began on the 8th October 2017 and wrapped on 3rd November.

Background and release 
The Boat is Winston Azzopardi’s first feature film. Produced by Latina Pictures, The Boat is based on a short film Head, for which the Azzopardis picked up the Best Short Film award at the Rome Film Festival in 2016.

The film premiered at 2018 Fantastic Fest in Austin, Texas. It was also shown at private viewings during the Cannes Film Festival in 2018, through which it secured a number of international distribution deals.

Reception 
The Boat received  critics rating on Rotten Tomatoes.

The Hollywood Reporter called the film "unique". The Times of Malta gave it a positive review, describing it as a "a discomfiting and chilling ride," and praising the actor's ability to "[project] the man’s myriad emotions with consummate ease," despite having "sparse dialogue to work with." Although there is no dialogue in the film, it has been described as having a "clever, twisting, dialogue-free screenplay".

For The Boat, Winston Azzopardi was nominated for Best Director at the 2019 National Film Awards UK.

References

External links

2018 films
Films set on boats